GO!GO!7188 (Go Go Nana Ichi Hachi Hachi), also known simply as Gogo, was a Japanese rock band with influences spanning from surf rock to punk rock to enka.

History 
In June 1998, Yumi Nakashima (nicknamed Yuu) and Akiko Hamada (nicknamed Akko), both alumnae of the same year at Shoyo High School in Kagoshima of Kyūshū, formed a band composed of girls, which was the forerunner of GO!GO!7188.
When the band broke up in 1999, Yu and Akko formed GO!GO!7188 to participate in the Teen's Music Festival, sponsored by Yamaha. They didn't win the grand prize, but they signed to the talent agency breast/milia.

Turkey then joined GoGo as a drummer, and the band then signed with major label Capitol Music (Toshiba-EMI). They went to Tokyo in February, 2000, and released their first single "Taiyō" on June 28.

On October 13, 2003, Akko released her solo album Kirari under the name of Akiko Hamada.

On March 1, 2004, Yu released her solo album Ten no Mikaku.

On November 2, 2005, Yu formed a new band, Chirinuruwowaka. On September 28, Akko released a major solo album "Aruyoude Naiyoude, Arumono" under the name of Akiko Hamada.

On October 1, 2006, Akiko Hamada announced on her official site that she had gotten married. Also, she changed her professional name to Akiko Noma.

In 2007, Go!Go!7188 transferred to BMG Japan in March. The band carried out their first tour of the United States as part of the multi-band Japan Nite tour, including performances in New York City, Los Angeles, and at SXSW in Austin, Texas.

In June 2010, they transferred to FlyingStar Records (Victor Entertainment).

On February 10, 2012, the band announced on their website that they were disbanding.

Members 
 , Real name:  is the lead vocalist, guitarist, and songwriter. Released a solo album, Ten no Mikaku as Yuu, in 2004. Released the album Iroha with side band, Chirinuruwowaka in 2005.
 , Real name:  is the bassist, backup vocalist, and lyricist. Released a solo album, Kirari under her real name in 2003. Second solo album, Aru yō de nai yō de, aru mono, was released on November 2, 2005.
 , Real name:  is the drummer, additional vocals.

Discography

Singles
 Taiyō (太陽, "Sun") (June 28, 2000)
 Jet Ninjin (ジェットにんぢん, "Jet Carrot") (August 30, 2000)
 Koi no Uta (こいのうた, "Love Song") (October 25, 2000)
 Mushi '98 (むし'98, "Bug '98") (November 16, 2000)
 Dotanba de Cancel (ドタン場でキャンセル, "Last Minute Cancel") (April 11, 2001)
 Aa Seishun (あぁ青春, "Ah, Youth") (July 11, 2001)
 C7 (October 24, 2001)
 Ukifune (浮舟) (October 9, 2002)
 Tane (種, "Seed") (April 25, 2003)
 Ruriiro (瑠璃色, "Color of Lapis Lazuli") (August 6, 2003)
 Aoi Kiretsu (青い亀裂, "Blue Crack") (August 25, 2004)
 Kinkyori Ren'ai (近距離恋愛, "Short Distance Lovemaking") (September 13, 2006)
 Manatsu no Dance Hall (真夏のダンスホール, "Midsummer Dance Hall") (June 28, 2007)
 Kataomoi Fighter "Itazura na Kiss" first ending (片思いファイター, "Unrequited Love Fighter") (May 28, 2008)
 Futashika Tashika (ふたしかたしか, "Uncertain Certainty") (January 14, 2009)

Albums

Original albums
 Dasoku Hokō (蛇足歩行) (December 6, 2000)
 Gyotaku (魚磔) (November 11, 2001)
 Tategami (鬣) (February 26, 2003)
 Ryūzetsuran (竜舌蘭) (October 27, 2004)
 Parade (パレード) (October 18, 2006)
 569 (ゴーロック Go Rock) (October 24, 2007)
 Antenna (アンテナ) (February 2, 2009)
 Go!!GO!GO!Go!! (June 2, 2010)

Other albums
 Tora no Ana (虎の穴) (July 10, 2002) (cover album)
 Kyū Ni Ichi Jiken (九・二一事件) (December 10, 2003) (live album)
 Gonbuto Tour Nippon Budōkan (Kanzen-ban) (ごんぶとツアー日本武道館(完全版)) (March 16, 2005) (live album)
 Who Plays a Go-Go? ~GO!GO!7188 Amateur Tribute Album~ (April 20, 2005) (tribute album)
 Best of GO!GO! (ベスト オブ ゴー！ゴー！) (April 15, 2006) (best album)
 Tora no Ana 2 (虎の穴 2) (May 28, 2008) (cover album)
 2man Tour Tetsuko no Hair + Open Night Family ~Yokae no Kazoku~ CD + DVD (October 29, 2008) (live album & DVD documentary)
 Coupling Best of GO!GO! (カップリング ベスト オブ ゴー! ゴー!) (May 16, 2012) (best album)
 very best of GO! GO! (ベリー　ベスト　オブ　ゴー!ゴー!) (october 10, 2012) (best album)

DVDs and videos
 GO!GO!7188 Tonosama Tour 2001 (GO!GO!7188とのさまツアー2001) (October 24, 2001)
 GO!GO! Daieizō-sai (GO!GO!大映像祭!) (March 19, 2003)
 GO!GO!7188 Gonbuto Tour Nihon Budokan (GO!GO!7188 ごんぶとツアー 日本武道館) (March 16, 2005)
 GO!GO! Daieizō-sai (Omake-tsuki) (GO!GO!大映像祭! (おまけ付)) (March 15, 2006)
 GO!GO!7188 6.21 Jiken'' (October 29, 2008) DVD (limited & regular editions)

Radio
 GO!GO!Sakurajima (2000)
 GO!GO!7188's allnightnippon-r (2000–2001)
 GO!GO!7188's BeiBeiKin (2004)
 GO!GO!7188's BeiBeiKin 1/2 (2005)
 GO!GO!7188's BeiBeiSui 1/2 (2005–present)

References

External links

 GO!GO!7188 Official Site Raafuru
 Ten no Chikaku  - Yuu's official site 
 Noma Akiko "Kirari" Official Website - Akiko Noma’s official site 
 Turkey Official Web Site "Heart Beat" - Turkey's official site 
 GO!GO!7188 World 

Japanese rock music groups
Musical groups from Kagoshima Prefecture